Daisy Bateman (born 20 February 2000) is an Australian rules footballer playing for the Western Bulldogs in the AFL Women's competition (AFLW). She has previously played for North Melbourne.

Early career
Prior to her draft year, Bateman played with Collingwood in the VFL Women's competition and with the Oakleigh Chargers in the TAC Cup Girls competition. She earned selection in the TAC Cup Girls Team of the Year and was named All-Australian for her performances at the 2018 AFL Women's Under 18 Championships. It was revealed she signed on with the club for one more season on 17 June 2021, tying her to the club until the end of 2022.

AFLW career
Bateman was drafted by North Melbourne with the club's first selection and the 25th pick overall in the 2018 AFL Women's draft.
In June 2022, Bateman was traded to Western Bulldogs.

Personal life
She grew up in Melbourne’s eastern suburbs and attended Methodist Ladies' College, Melbourne.

References

External links 

2000 births
Living people
North Melbourne Football Club (AFLW) players
Australian rules footballers from Victoria (Australia)
Oakleigh Chargers players (NAB League Girls)